Ben Miller (born 31 August 1999) is a professional Australian rules footballer playing for the Richmond Football Club in the Australian Football League (AFL). He was drafted by Richmond with the 63rd pick in the 2017 AFL national draft and made his debut for the club in round 23 of the 2021 season. In 2019 he was a VFL premiership player while playing reserves grade football for Richmond.

Early life and junior football
Miller grew up in Lamington in Kalgoorlie in regional Western Australia. He represented his state at the 2015 AFL Under 16 Championships and again at the 2017 AFL Under 18 Championships. Miller played local football with Railways in the Goldfields Football League and was a part of the club's premiership side in 2017. He also played junior representative football with Subiaco in the WAFL colts league.

AFL career

In 2019, Miller was a VFL premiership player while playing with Richmond's reserves side at the lower level.

After three-years on the Richmond list without playing a senior match, Miller was selected to make his AFL debut in the final round of 2021 season.

Statistics
Updated to the end of round 23, 2022.

|-
| 2018
|  || 46 || 0 || – || – || – || – || – || – || – || – || – || – || – || – || – || – || – || –
|-
| 2019
|  || 46 || 0 || – || – || – || – || – || – || – || – || – || – || – || – || – || – || – || –
|- 
| 2020
|  || 46 || 0 || – || – || – || – || – || – || – || – || – || – || – || – || – || – || – || –
|-
| 2021
|  || 46 || 1 || 0 || 0 || 4 || 2 || 6 || 2 || 0 || 0 || 0.0 || 0.0 || 4.0 || 2.0 || 6.0 || 2.0 || 0.0 || 0.0
|- 
| 2022
|  || 46 || 10 || 3 || 0 || 48 || 36 || 84 || 27 || 25 || 33 || 0.3 || 0.0 || 4.8 || 3.6 || 8.4 || 2.7 || 2.5 || 3.3
|- class="sortbottom" 
! colspan=3| Career
! 11
! 3
! 0
! 52
! 38
! 90
! 29
! 25
! 33
! 0.3
! 0.0
! 4.7
! 3.5
! 8.2
! 2.6
! 2.3
! 3.0
|}

References

External links

Ben Miller's profile at AFL Draft Central

Living people
1999 births
Australian rules footballers from Western Australia
Richmond Football Club players